Micromyrtus chrysodema is a plant species of the family Myrtaceae endemic to Western Australia.

The densely branched shrub is found on sand plains in the Goldfields-Esperance region of Western Australia near Leonora where it grows in red sandy soils.

References

chrysodema
Endemic flora of Western Australia
Myrtales of Australia
Rosids of Western Australia
Endangered flora of Australia
Plants described in 2006
Taxa named by Barbara Lynette Rye